Daniel Goldschmitt (born December 22, 1989) is a German footballer who plays for Kickers Offenbach II.

External links

1989 births
Living people
Kickers Offenbach players
3. Liga players
German footballers
Association football defenders